The Socotra white-eye (Zosterops socotranus) is a bird species in the family Zosteropidae. It is found on the island of Socotra and in Somaliland.

This species was formerly treated as a subspecies of the Abyssinian white-eye (Zosterops abyssinicus) named Zosterops abyssinicus socotranus. A molecular phylogenetic study published in 2014 found that it is not closely related to the Abyssinian white-eye and it is now treated as a separate species.

References

Socotra white-eye
Fauna of Socotra
Socotra white-eye
Taxa named by Oscar Neumann